Magic for Beginners may refer to:

 Magic for Beginners (short story collection), an anthology of stories by Kelly Link,
 "Magic for Beginners" (novella), an award-winning novella by Kelly Link